Flatland Cavalry is a country and Americana band from Lubbock, Texas.  The band's original members were vocalist Cleto Cordero, drummer Jason Albers, bassist Jonathan Saenz, guitarist Reid Dillon, and violinist Laura Jane. Jane departed the band in July 2018, and was replaced by Wesley Hall.

Flatland Cavalry was formed in 2012 by Cordero and Albers, who were college roommates in Midland and performed together before moving to Lubbock, where the rest of the members came together by 2014.  In May 2015, the band's debut EP, titled Come May, was released after a crowd-funding campaign was used to finance its production.  On April 1, 2016, their first full-length album, Humble Folks, was released to positive reviews and comparisons to the music of the Turnpike Troubadours.  Humble Folks peaked at number 17 on the Billboard Americana/Folk albums chart and number 38 on the Top Country Albums chart.  The band's second studio album, Homeland Insecurity, was released on January 18, 2019.

Kaitlin Butts, who is married to Cordero and an accomplished musician in her own right, is a frequent collaborator with the band and a oft-seen part of their live shows.

Formation 
The roots for the formation of Flatland Cavalry were first laid when Cleto Cordero and Jason Albers began playing at local venues while rooming together at Midland College. The two had been jamming together since junior high but it was not until they moved to Lubbock in 2012 that the band began to take shape. It was here, while studying at Texas Tech University, that the duo met Laura Jane at a house party. Jonathan Saenz and Reid Dillon joined the rest in 2014 and the band's lineup was complete.

Cordero himself began playing the guitar at age 14 and wrote his first song by the time he was 17 years old for Lee High School's Rebel Lee Court Awards Ceremony. He writes most of the band's songs apart from playing the role of lead guitarist and singer with Jason Albers on drums, Jonathan Saenz on bass, Reid Dillon on guitar and Wesley Hall on violin. Hall took the place of Laura Jane when she parted ways with the band in 2018.

Discography

EPs

Come May (2015) 
The band released its first EP in 2015, gathering funds for its production via a crowdfunding platform. The band reached its goal of USD5000/- in just eight days, a testament to the fan following they had already mustered through live performances.

Track List

1. No Shade of Green

2. Love Me in the Water

3. Summertime Love

4. Missing You

5. Ain't Over You Yet

Albums

Humble Folks (2016) 
It was the release of its debut EP followed by its first album, Humble Folks, in 2016 that really got the ball rolling, with music insiders comparing Flatland to the likes of the Turnpike Troubadours, lauding the band for its youthful blend of country, folk, Americana and rock. Humble Folks peaked at #38 on the Billboard Country Music Top 100 chart and #17 on the American/Folk Albums chart.

Track List

1. One I Want

2. A Good Memory

3. February Snow

4. Tall City Blues

5. Coyote (The Ballad of Roy Johnson)

6. Devil Off My Back

7. Stompin' Grounds

8. Goodbye Kiss

9. A Life Where We Work Out (Featuring Kaitlin Butts)

10. Traveler's Song

11. Humble Folks

Homeland Insecurity (2019) 
In 2018, Laura Jane left the band and was soon replaced by Wesley Hall on fiddle. With the new lineup in place, the quintet released their second album, Homeland Insecurity, in 2019; three years after the release of their debut. In the time that lapsed between the two, the band toured extensively, honing their skill as musicians and drawing on their experiences to craft their sophomore work. As the band's primary songwriter, Cordero penned lyrics for Homeland Insecurity are markedly more sophisticated than his previous songs. The album was widely well-received and praised for its distinctive sound.

Track List

1. Come Back Down

2. Honeywine

3. Old School

4. Other Side of Lonesome

5. Back to Me

6. Living by Moonlight

7. Ashes

8. Lonely Then

9. Pretty Women

10. Sleeping Alone

11. Years from Now

Welcome to Countryland (2021) 

Track List

1. Country Is...

2. Some Things Never Change

3. A Cowboy Knows How

4. Gettin' By

5. Well-Spent Time

6. Life Without You (Featuring Kaitlin Butts)

7. No Ace In the Hole

8. It's Good To Be Back ('Round Here Again)

9. Tilt Your Chair Back

10. Fallen Star

11. Daydreamer

12. Dancin' Around a Fire

13. Off Broadway

14. ...Meantime (Featuring Hailey Whitters)

Songs To Keep You Warm(2022) 

Track List

1. Mountain Song

2. Damaged Goods

3. How Long (Featuring Kaitlin Butts)

4. Parallel (Featuring Ashley Monroe)

5. If We Said Goodbye

6. Show Me Now Which Way To Go

References

Country music groups from Texas
Musical groups from Lubbock, Texas
Musical groups established in 2012
2012 establishments in Texas